Decalepis hamiltonii is a species of plant in the family Apocynaceae. It is endemic to Peninsular India and known by its names of maredu kommulu, nannari kommulu or madina kommulu in Telugu, makali beru or vagani beru in Kannada and magali kizhangu in Tamil is a plant whose root is used in Ayurvedic medicines and for use in pickles and to make sharbat.

The English name of swallowroot is sometimes used for the plant and studies have shown that it has insecticidal activity and a potential use in control of stored grain pests. The active ingredient in the root was synthesized and encapsulated with beta-cyclodextrins. The roots were also subjected to supercritical carbon-dioxide based extraction at the Central Food Technological Research Institute, Mysore, India.
The plant is often confused with Hemidesmus indicus, Indian sarsaparilla 
The root contains antioxidants and extraction methods for it have been patented.

The popularity of Decalepis in the international market has recently made its price soar and sends worrying signals about it getting being endangered due to over-exploitation.

References

Periplocoideae